Ohere Sadiku Abubakar  FNSE, (born 13 July 1966) is a Nigerian politician and the Senator representing Kogi Central Senatorial District . He hails from Okene LGA of Kogi State. He has served as the Special Adviser overseeing the affairs of the Ministry of Local Government and Chieftaincy Affairs in Kogi State from January to August in 2019. He has also served as the  Honorable Commissioner, Ministry of Local Government and Chieftaincy Affairs until December 2019 with the same functions of overseeing the affairs of the Ministry. In January 2020, at the inception of the second tenure of Yahaya Bello, he was re-appointed to serve as the Honorable Commissioner for Works and Housing, a position he voluntarily resigned from on 16 April 2022, in pursuant of his aspirations to contest for Senator representing Kogi Central Senatorial District in the Federal Legislature. Abubakar Ohere is a Fellow of Nigeria Society of Engineers (NSE).

Early life and education 
Ohere Sadiku Abubakar was born on 13 July 1966 in Okene LGA, Kogi State. He commenced his pathway in education in 1975 at St. Andrew's School, Okene. In 1979, I proceeded to Lennon Memorial College, Ageva for his secondary education. He, thereafter, obtained an Ordinary National Diploma in Metallurgical Engineering from Kwara State Polytechnic, Ilorin and proceeded to the Federal Polytechnic, Idah in 1992 for his Higher National Diploma. He has a master's degree in Mining Engineering (M.Eng). from the Federal University of Technology, Akure.

Civil Service 
Engr. Ohere joined the Federal Civil service in 1996. His working career spanned about 20 years beginning as a field engineer and gradually rising to the management level in the Federal Ministry of Mines and Steel Development.

Fellowships and memberships 
Fellow of the Nigerian Society of Engineers
Fellow of the Fellow,  Institute of Industrialists and Corporate Administrators (IICA).
Corporate Member of the Nigerian Society of Mining Engineers (NSME)
Member of the Council for the Regulation of Engineering in Nigeria (COREN)
Member of the Council of Nigerian Mining Engineers and Geoscientists (COMEG)

Political career 
On his political appointment in 2016, he paused his Civil Service career to serve under the New Direction Government of His Excellency, Governor Yahaya Bello from January 2016 to August 2019 as a Special Adviser overseeing the affairs of the Ministry of Local Government and Chieftaincy Affairs. In 2019, he was appointed Honorable Commissioner, Ministry of Local Government and Chieftaincy Affairs until December 2019 with the same functions of overseeing the affairs of the Ministry. In January 2020, at the inception of the second tenure of His Excellency, Governor Yahaya Bello, he was appointed again into his cabinet to serve as the Honorable Commissioner for Works and Housing, a position he voluntarily resigned from on the 16th day of April 2022, in pursuant of the aspirations and desires of the  people to contest as Senator representing Kogi Central Senatorial District in the Federal Legislature.

References 

1966 births
Living people
Nigerian politicians